Starunya or Starunia is a village in Ivano-Frankivsk Raion, Ivano-Frankivsk Oblast, Ukraine. It belongs to Bohorodchany settlement hromada, one of the hromadas of Ukraine. 

Until 18 July 2020, Starunia belonged to Bohorodchany Raion. The raion was abolished in July 2020 as part of the administrative reform of Ukraine, which reduced the number of raions of Ivano-Frankivsk Oblast to six. The area of Bohorodchany Raion was merged into Ivano-Frankivsk Raion.

References

Villages in Ivano-Frankivsk Raion